E105 is part of the International E-road network, which is a series of main roads in Europe. It is a north–south reference road, meaning it crosses Europe from north to south, and other E-road numbers have been calculated based on these reference roads.

Description 
E105 starts from Hesseng, (just south of Kirkenes), Norway  and runs along Russia's R21, M10, M2: Ukraine's M20, M29, and M18 to Yalta, Crimea (Russian-occupied territory of Ukraine).  Russians call this the Crimea Highway (Крымское шоссе), and de facto officially marked Republic of Crimea section as 35А-002.

Route 

Kirkenes

: border with Norway - Pechenga - Murmansk - Petrozavodsk - Saint Petersburg
 (or ): Saint Petersburg - Veliky Novgorod - Tver - Moscow
: within Moscow
: Moscow - Tula - Oryol - Kursk - Belgorod - border with Ukraine

: border with Russia - Kharkiv
: Kharkiv - Hubynykha - Zaporizhia - Melitopol
 (disputed between /)
35A-002/: Dzhankoy - Simferopol - Alushta - Yalta

Gallery

External links 
 UN Economic Commission for Europe: Overall Map of E-road Network (2007)

199105
E105
E105
European routes in Ukraine
Roads within the Arctic Circle
Transport in Yalta